Asukai Masaaki refers to two separate Japanese waka poets, both members of the prestigious Asukai family, whose names are written with different kanji.
Asukai Masaaki (13th century) (飛鳥井雅顕)
Asukai Masaaki (17th century) (飛鳥井雅章)

Asukai family